The Register Star is a daily newspaper published in Hudson, New York and covering all of Columbia County, New York.

References

Daily newspapers published in New York (state)
Newspapers established in 1785
1785 establishments in New York (state)